Liana Ghazaryan (born 15 February 2000) is an Armenian footballer who plays as a defender for Gyumri and the Armenia women's national team.

International career
Ghazaryan capped for Armenia at senior level in a 1–1 friendly draw against Lithuania on 6 March 2020.

See also
List of Armenia women's international footballers

References

2000 births
Living people
Women's association football defenders
Armenian women's footballers
Armenia women's international footballers